Steel Bananas is a Canadian artist collective and publishing house.

History
Established in 2008 in Toronto, Ontario, Canada, the frequency of their publications has varied from monthly (2008-2010), to quarterly (2011-2013), to annual chapbooks and interdisciplinary projects in various media (2014+). Originally established as a collective of young artists, writers, and university students in Toronto, the collective matured into a network of professional artists and a dedicated publishing house that expanded into Vancouver, British Columbia, Canada, and Leeds, United Kingdom under the leadership of Karen Correia da Silva and Curran Folkers.

Major works

Overachiever. Leeds, UK, 2015–2016.
 Works in the Public Domain. Leeds, UK, 2015-ongoing.
 Lucy. Vancouver and Toronto, Ontario, Canada, 2014-ongoing.
 Trigger Warning: Demons. Toronto, Ontario, Canada, 2014.
 Steel Bananas Publications. Toronto and Vancouver, British Columbia, Canada and Leeds, UK, 2012-ongoing.
 Verbs. Vancouver, British Columbia, Canada, 2012.
 Bruised / Modern Ruin. Toronto, Ontario, Canada, 2010–2011.
 The Artichoke Revue. Toronto, Ontario, Canada, 2010.
 Eggplant. Toronto, Ontario, Canada, 2009–2010.
 Gulch: An Assemblage. Toronto, Ontario, Canada, 2009.
 Steel Bananas Zine. Toronto, Ontario, Canada, 2008–2010.

Major publications

 A State, A Statue, A Statute by Adam Abbas, 2014.
 Hate Letters from Buddhists by Dave Hurlow, 2014.
 Sew with Butterflies by Anna Veprinska, 2014.
 Free Agent by Katrina Pruss, 2014.
 East Van Sound by Karen Correia da Silva, 2014.
 Public Consultation by Curran Folkers, 2014.
 Publics by yta, 2012.
 Dear Adolf by Daniel Scott Tysdal, 2012.
 Fuck Irony by Matt Marshall and Karen Correia da Silva, 2012.

References

Organizations based in Toronto
Canadian artist groups and collectives